A by-election was held in the federal riding of Leeds—Grenville—Thousand Islands and Rideau Lakes in Ontario on December 3, 2018, following the sudden death of incumbent Conservative MP Gord Brown on May 2, 2018.

The seat was retained for the Conservatives by riding association president Michael Barrett.

Background

Constituency 
Leeds—Grenville—Thousand Islands and Rideau Lakes is a rural riding in Eastern Ontario. It consists of the entirety of the United Counties of Leeds and Grenville.

Representation 
The riding was created in 1976. The MP since 2004 was Gord Brown who gained the seat from Liberal MP Joe Jordan at the 2004 federal election. Brown was re-elected in 2006, 2008, 2011 and 2015. The seat became vacant when Brown died of a sudden heart attack in his Parliament Hill office in Ottawa.

Campaign 
Colin Brown, Brown's nephew, announced his candidacy for the Conservative nomination and was quickly endorsed by Premier of Ontario Doug Ford. In addition, Edwardsburgh/Cardinal town councillor and federal riding association president Michael Barrett, government-relations specialist Stephanie Mitton, and Anne Johnston, a former aide to Leeds—Grenville—Thousand Islands and Rideau Lakes MPP Steve Clark also ran for the Conservative nomination. Former Canadian Senator and interim Leader of the Opposition in the Ontario Legislature Bob Runciman was rumoured to be interested in seeking the Conservative nomination for the by-election but decided against it after his wife encountered some health issues. Barrett won the nomination at a local party convention at the Brockville Memorial Centre on August 11 in a contest that ran to a fourth ballot.

2015 Liberal candidate Mary Jean McFall – a lawyer, former Brockville city councillor and immediate former Chief of Staff to Agriculture Minister Lawrence MacAulay – won the Liberal nomination for this by-election unopposed.

Michelle Taylor was the NDP candidate; Taylor ran for the Ontario NDP in Leeds—Grenville—Thousand Islands and Rideau Lakes in the 2018 provincial election.

Lorraine Rekmans, the Green candidate for this riding in 2015, ran again for the party.

The Speaker's warrant regarding the vacancy was received on May 3, 2018; under the Parliament of Canada Act the writ for a by-election had to be dropped no later than October 30, 2018, 180 days after the Chief Electoral Officer was officially notified of the vacancy via a warrant issued by the Speaker. On October 28, 2018, the writ was dropped for a by-election for December 3, 2018.

Result

2015 result

References 

2018 elections in Canada
2018 in Ontario
Federal by-elections in Ontario
Politics of Ontario
Brockville
Leeds and Grenville United Counties